Paul Kölliker (19 February 1932 – 11 January 2021) was a Swiss rower. He competed in the men's coxless four event at the 1960 Summer Olympics.

References

External links

1932 births
2021 deaths
Deaths from the COVID-19 pandemic in Switzerland
Swiss male rowers
Olympic rowers of Switzerland
Rowers at the 1960 Summer Olympics
Sportspeople from the canton of Solothurn